Tablet may refer to:

Medicine
 Tablet (pharmacy), a mixture of pharmacological substances pressed into a small cake or bar, colloquially called a "pill"

Computing
 Tablet computer, a mobile computer that is primarily operated by touching the screen
 Graphics tablet or digitizing tablet, a computer input device for capturing hand-drawn images and graphics
 Tablet, a section of columns in a range of rows in Google's Bigtable NoSQL database

Confectionery
 Tablet (confectionery), a medium-hard, sugary confection from Scotland
 Tableting, a confectionery manufacturing process
 A type of chocolate bar

Inscription, printing, and writing media
 Clay tablet, one of the earliest known writing mediums
 Wax tablet, used by scribes as far back as ancient Greece
 Notebook of blank or lined paper, usually bound with glue or staples along one edge
 Stele, slab of stone or wood erected as a monument or marker
 Tabula ansata, tablets with handles
 Vindolanda tablets, Roman era writings found in Britain

Periodicals and printed works
 Tablet (magazine), a daily online magazine of Jewish news, ideas, and culture
 Tablet (newspaper), a newspaper published in Seattle, Washington
 Tablet (religious), a traditional term used for certain religious texts
 The Tablet, a Catholic magazine published in the United Kingdom
 The Tablet (Brooklyn), a Catholic newspaper published in the United States
 The New Zealand Tablet, a former weekly Catholic newspaper

Other uses
 Tabula rasa, the theory originating with Aristotle of the newborn mind as an uninscribed tablet or blank slate
 Tablet is a form of token (railway signalling)
 Tyer's Electric Train Tablet, a system of controlling access to single-track railway lines in Britain

See also
 Plaque (disambiguation)